Bernd Thiele (24 January 1956 – 26 March 2017) was a German footballer. He made 178 appearances in the Bundesliga and played 91 matches in the 2. Bundesliga for Schalke 04 and Hannover 96.

References

External links 

German footballers
Association football defenders
Association football midfielders
Bundesliga players
2. Bundesliga players
FC Schalke 04 players
Hannover 96 players
1956 births
2017 deaths